Gaston Eugène Marie Bonnier (9 April 1853 in Paris – 2 January 1922) was a French botanist and plant ecologist.

Biography 
Bonnier first studied at École Normale Supérieure in Paris from 1873 to 1876. Together with Charles Flahault, he studied at Uppsala University in 1878. They published two articles about their impressions:
 Observations sur la flore cryptogamique de la Scandinavie
 Sur la distribution des végétaux dans la region moyenne de la presqu’ile Scandinave (both with Charles Flahault 1879)
 
He became assistant professor, later full professor, of botany at Sorbonne in 1887 and, in addition, he founded a Plant Biological Laboratory in Fontainebleau in 1889. The same year, he co-founded the scientific journal Revue Générale de Botanique, which he edited until 1922. 
He was an early exponent of experimental plant ecology. He transplanted alpine plants between the Alps and Pyrenees and the research garden in Fontainebleau. The results were published in:
 Cultures expérimentales dans les Alpes et les Pyrénées. Revue Générale de Botanique 2 (1890): 513–546.
 Les plantes arctiques comparées aux mêmes espèces des Alpes et des Pyrénées (1894).
 Nouvelles observations sur les cultures expérimentales à diverses altitudes et cultures par semis. Revue Générale de Botanique 22 (1920): 305–326.

He authored several floras of France, such as 
 Nouvelle flore du Nord de la France et de la Belgique pour la détermination facile des plantes sans mots techniques. Vol. I. Tableaux synoptiques des plantes vasculaires de la flore de la France. P. Dupont, Paris, 1894 (With Georges de Layens (1834–1897)).
 Vol. II. Nouvelle Flore des mousses et des hépatiques with Charles Isidore Douin (1858–1944). P. Dupont, Paris, 1895.
 Vol. III. Nouvelle Flore des champignons with Julien Noël Costantin (1857–1936) and Léon Jean Marie Dufour (1862–1942). P. Dupont, Paris, 1895.
 Flore complète illustrée de France, Suisse et Belgique. (1911).

Notable students of Gaston Bonnier include Henri Devaux, Maurice Bouly de Lesdain, Paul Becquerel, Louis Emberger, Paul Jaccard, and Albert Maige among others.

References

1853 births
1922 deaths
Members of the French Academy of Sciences
Corresponding members of the Saint Petersburg Academy of Sciences
20th-century French botanists
Academic staff of the University of Paris
French ecologists
19th-century French botanists
Plant ecologists
Lamarckism